Protein kinase C-binding protein NELL1 also known as NEL-like protein 1 (NELL1) or Nel-related protein 1 (NRP1) is a protein that in humans is encoded by the NELL1 gene.

Function 

This gene encodes a cytoplasmic protein that contains epidermal growth factor (EGF) -like repeats. The encoded heterotrimeric protein may be involved in cell growth regulation and differentiation. A similar protein in rodents is involved in craniosynostosis. An alternative splice variant has been described but its full-length sequence has not been determined.

Recent study by UCLA researchers shows that administering the protein NELL-1 intravenously stimulates significant bone formation through the regenerative ability of stem cells.

References

Further reading

Human proteins